Richard H. Frenkiel (born March 4, 1943 in Brooklyn, New York) is an American  engineer, known for his significant role in the early development of cellular telephone networks.

Professional career 

Frenkiel earned a bachelor's degree in mechanical engineering at Tufts University and a master's degree at Rutgers University in 1965. Beginning in 1963, he worked for Bell Labs where he first designed recorded announcement machines.  In late 1965, he was invited to get involved in the early planning of cellular telephone systems and was paired with Philip T. Porter, a cellular pioneer. They focused on cell geometry, vehicle locating and handoff, and overall system architecture, leading to an early system proposal. With Porter and Joel S. Engel, he was an author of the "High Capacity Mobile Telephone System Feasibility Studies and System Plan" which was filed with the FCC in 1971 and became an important cellular text.

From 1971 to 1973, Frenkiel worked at AT&T Corporate Headquarters, where he became a primary interface with the FCC on Cellular issues.  In 1973, he returned to Bell Labs, where he managed a group of mobile phone system engineers. Their focus was on vehicle-locating techniques, maximizing channel efficiency, and methods of splitting cells to include additional towers for high volume areas. His "underlaid cell" concept greatly reduced the cost and logistic complexity of cell splitting  and became AT&T's most sought-after patent in cross-licensing agreements.

For five years Frenkiel was head of the Mobile Systems Engineering Dept. at Bell Labs during the transition from experimental systems to commercial service.  His department developed interface specifications for nationwide compatibility among cellular companies.  He also served on the Electronic Industries Alliance Committee which proposed rules for cellular systems that were adopted by the FCC.  After the FCC allocated new frequencies in 1968 for mobile phones, Frenkiel's engineering team developed specifications for cellular networks and its parametrization (1971).  This was the basis for AMPS.

Frenkiel transferred to the AT&T Information Systems Labs in 1983, where he became head of cordless telephone development.  He led the development of the 5000 series of cordless telephones, which achieved a much higher level of quality and performance than previous cordless telephones. He was also responsible for the early manufacture of those products in Singapore, pioneering the outsourcing of manufacturing within AT&T.

In 1994, Frenkiel was a co-recipient, along with Joel S. Engel, of the National Medal of Technology for their contributions to the creation of cellular systems. He has also received the Alexander Graham Bell Medal (1987)  and the Achievement Award of the Industrial Research Institute (1992).  He has been elected to the National Academy of Engineering and is a Fellow of the IEEE.

In 1994 Frenkiel returned to Rutgers University where he became a Visiting Professor of Electrical and Computer Engineering, and Director for Strategic Planning at  WINLAB at Rutgers.  He also works as an industry consultant and writer, and was Mayor of Manalapan, New Jersey in 1999. He currently teaches a course in Wireless Business Strategy at Rutgers University

Publications

  -- Cellular radiotelephone system structured for flexible use of different cell sizes, filed September 22, 1976, issued March 13, 1979

See also

 History of mobile phones

Awards

IEEE Fellow (life fellow)
IEEE Alexander Graham Bell Medal 1987 With Joel S. Engel and William C. Jakes, Jr.
Charles Stark Draper Prize 2013 With Joel S. Engel, Martin Cooper, Thomas Haug and Yoshihisa Okumura
National Medal of Technology 1994 received from President Bill Clinton

References

External links 
 IEEE Biography of Richard H. Frenkiel
 

Scientists at Bell Labs
American electrical engineers
Tufts University School of Engineering alumni
Rutgers University alumni
National Medal of Technology recipients
Draper Prize winners
Fellow Members of the IEEE
1943 births
Scientists from New York City
Living people
Members of the United States National Academy of Engineering